Timrat (lit. Date) is a community settlement in northern Israel. Located in the Lower Galilee near Nahalal, it falls under the jurisdiction of Jezreel Valley Regional Council.

History
The village was established in 1981, though the site had previously been the location of kibbutz Timorim, which was established in 1948, but moved to the centre of the country in 1954 due to a shortage of land. Timorim had been established on the land of the depopulated Arab village of  Ma'alul.

The village is situated near the historic tell Shimron, which is the northernmost point of a natural winterthorn population.

Notable residents 
Shir Levo Football player

References

External links

Village website 

Community settlements
Populated places established in 1981
Populated places in Northern District (Israel)
1981 establishments in Israel